Cliniodes inferalis is a moth in the family Crambidae. It was described by James E. Hayden in 2011. It is found in Costa Rica and the eastern Andes from the Valle de Cauca in Colombia to Peru (Junín).

The length of the forewings is 15–17 mm for males and 17–18 mm for females. The forewing costa is dark red and the basal area is grey with dark violet scales. The medial area is dark violet-brown and postmedial area is brownish violet. The hindwings are translucent white with a black marginal band. Adults have been recorded on wing in January, February and from May to November.

Etymology
The species name refers to the maculation that is darker than Cliniodes superbalis, from which its distinct status is inferred. The name is derived from Latin infera (meaning the lower world).

References

Moths described in 2011
Eurrhypini